Scott Seiver (born April 14, 1985 in Columbus, Ohio) is a professional poker player from Cold Spring Harbor, New York, now residing in Las Vegas, Nevada who won the 2008 World Series of Poker $5,000 No Limit Hold'em event and is the winner of the $25,100 buy-in High Roller event at the 2010 L.A. Poker Classic.
On April 29, 2015 Seiver became the 9th player in GPI history to be ranked #1.

Live poker
Seiver, with twelve cashes at the World Series of Poker (WSOP), won his first bracelet in the 2008 WSOP $5,000 No Limit Hold'em event earning $755,891.

Seiver's other poker accomplishments include springing to fame by appearing on Pokerstars' the Big Game, showcasing his unique mouth-covering method of hiding mouth-breathing tells, as well as winning the $25,100 buy-in High Roller event at the 2010 L.A. Poker Classic earning $425,330 in a final table that included runner-up Daniel Alaei, Jason Mercier (3rd), Lee Markholt (4th), Tommy Vedes (5th) and Will Molson (6th).

In 2009 he finished 3rd in the PokerStars Caribbean Adventure $24,500 No Limit Hold'em – High Roller event earning $137,000 and later that year won the $5,000 No Limit Hold'em event at the 2009 Doyle Brunson Five Diamond World Poker Classic earning $218,008.

In 2010 he came in 4th in the $25,000 Invitational High Roller Bounty Shootout earning along with the bounties a total of $215,000 at the 2010 Deep Stack Extravaganza, later he finished 4th at the Main Event of the 2010 PokerStars.net North American Poker Tour (NAPT) at Mohegan Sun earning  $190,000.

In May 2011, Scott Seiver won the Season IX WPT World Championship. He defeated Farzad Bonyadi heads-up, earning $1,618,344.

On January 8, 2013, Seiver won the 2013 PokerStars Caribbean Adventure Super High Roller event for $2,003,480.

On June 29, 2014, he finished 6th in the $1,000,000 The Big One for One Drop at the 2014 World Series of Poker.

As of May 2015, he hit rank 1 on the Global Poker Index Ranking.

On July 2, 2015, Seiver finished 2nd in the $500,000 Super High Roller Bowl for $5,160,000. As of October 2016, his total live earnings exceed $21,600,000.

On May 13, 2022, Seiver was announced as Phil Hellmuth's Round 4 opponent in High Stakes Duel III. The match was for $800,000, and Hellmuth defeated Seiver on May 18, 2022.

On June 3, 2022, Seiver won his fourth WSOP bracelet in Event #3: $2,500 No-Limit Hold'em Freezeout for $320,059.

World Series of Poker bracelets

References

External links
 Poker Verdict: - Player Focus: mastrblastr
 poker-king.com – Who is Mastrblastr?
 CardPlayer.com the Scoop

1985 births
Living people
World Series of Poker bracelet winners
World Poker Tour winners
American poker players
Brown University alumni
20th-century American Jews
American people of Italian descent
People from Cold Spring Harbor, New York
21st-century American Jews